Henry Strother Cautley, 1st Baron Cautley KC (9 December 1863 – 21 September 1946), known as Sir Henry Cautley, Bt, from 1924 to 1936, was a British barrister, judge and Conservative politician.

Background and education
Cautley was the son of Henry Cautley and his wife Mary Ellen (née Strother). He was educated at Charterhouse School and King's College, Cambridge, and was later called to the Bar, Middle Temple.

Political and judicial career
He soon turned to politics and unsuccessfully contested Dewsbury in 1892 and 1895. However, in 1900 he was elected to the House of Commons as Member of Parliament (MP) for Leeds East. Cautley lost this seat in 1906 when he was defeated by James O'Grady but returned to Parliament in January 1910 as MP for East Grinstead, a seat he held until 1936. Apart from his political career he was also a Recorder of Sunderland from 1918 to 1935. He was made a King's Counsel in 1919 and created a Baronet, of Horsted Keynes in the County of Sussex, in 1924. On his retirement from the House of Commons in 1936 he was raised to the peerage as Baron Cautley, of Lindfield in the County of Sussex.

Personal life
Cautley married at St. Paul's Church, Woodhouse Eaves, Leicestershire, on 1 October 1902, Alice Bohun Fox, daughter of B. H. C. Fox, JP, of Maplewell, Woodhouse Eaves; they had no children. He died in 1946, aged 82, when the baronetcy and barony became extinct.

References

 
 The Peerage.com

External links
 

1863 births
1946 deaths
Barons in the Peerage of the United Kingdom
Peers created by Edward VIII
Alumni of King's College, Cambridge
English King's Counsel
Conservative Party (UK) MPs for English constituencies
People educated at Charterhouse School
People from Lindfield, West Sussex
People from Sunderland
Politicians from Tyne and Wear
People from East Grinstead
20th-century King's Counsel
UK MPs 1900–1906
UK MPs 1910
UK MPs 1910–1918
UK MPs 1918–1922
UK MPs 1922–1923
UK MPs 1923–1924
UK MPs 1924–1929
UK MPs 1929–1931
UK MPs 1931–1935
UK MPs 1935–1945
UK MPs who were granted peerages